Ettore Tavernari (19 January 1905 – 8 October 1981) was an Italian athlete who competed mainly in the 400 metres and 800 metres.

Biography
Tavernari competed for Italy in the 1928 Summer Olympics, he has 22 caps in national team from 1927 to 1936. He won the individual national championship nine times.
5 wins on 400 metres (1928, 1929, 1932, 1934, 1935)
4 wins on 800 metres (1927, 1928, 1929, 1932)

See also
 400 metres winners of Italian Athletics Championships
 800 metres winners of Italian Athletics Championships

References

External links
 
 
 Athlete profile from site Track and Field Statistics

1905 births
1981 deaths
Sportspeople from Modena
Athletes (track and field) at the 1928 Summer Olympics
Olympic athletes of Italy
Italian male sprinters
Italian male middle-distance runners
Italian Athletics Championships winners